January is a given name. It is derived from the name of the month, which comes from Janus, a Roman god who stood for beginnings and transitions.

People 
January Jones (singer), an American pop singer née Jacqueline Allison
January Jones (born 1978), American actress
January Suchodolski (1797–1875), Polish artist
January Thompson (born 1983), American singer

Fictional characters 
January, one of the main characters in Geoffrey Chaucer's "The Merchant's Tale"
January, an AI from the 2017 video game Prey
January, the protagonist in Alix Harrow's The Ten Thousand Doors of January
January, the protagonist in Emily Henry's Beach Read

See also 
January (surname)
January (disambiguation)

References 

English feminine given names
English given names